Amara Bangoura may refer to:

 Amara Karba Bangoura (born 1986), Guinean footballer
 Amara Bangoura (diplomat), Guinean diplomat and current ambassador to Russia